A pata da gazela is a novel written by the Brazilian writer José de Alencar. It was first published in 1870.

External links
 A pata da gazela, the book

1870 Brazilian novels
Novels by José de Alencar
Brazilian novels
Portuguese-language novels